Joe Spinell (born Joseph Spagnuolo; October 28, 1936 – January 13, 1989) was an American character actor who appeared in films in the 1970s and 1980s, as well as various stage productions on and off Broadway. He played supporting roles in The Godfather (1972) and The Godfather Part II (1974), Rocky (1976), Rocky II (1979), Taxi Driver (1976), Sorcerer (1977), Cruising (1980), etc.

Until Spinell's passing in 1989, his career consisted of bit to major supporting roles. Spinell played lead roles in horror films, sharing the screen with actress Caroline Munro in the first two: the psychological slasher film Maniac (1980), the horror comedy The Last Horror Film (1982), and the slasher film The Undertaker (1988) released posthumously.

Early life
Spinell was born Joseph Spagnuolo in Manhattan, New York, the youngest of six children of Italian immigrant parents. His father, Pelegrino Spagnuolo (1892–1950), died from liver and kidney disease. His mother, Filomena Spagnuolo (1903–1987), was an actress who played bit parts in several movies, some of them alongside her son. Spinell was born at his family's apartment on Second Avenue in Kips Bay, Manhattan, an area then home to 10,000 Italian Americans.  A few years after the death of his father, he moved with his mother and older siblings to Woodside, Queens, New York, where he lived off-and-on for the remainder of his life. In the mid and late 1970s when living in California, he lived in an apartment in the Oakwood Apartments complex near Toluca Lake located on Barham Boulvard. He was known to heavily abuse drugs and alcohol intermittently throughout his career, especially during periods of unemployment. Spinell was born with hemophilia and had chronic asthma for most of his life.

Career

Early 1970s to 1982: Rise to prominence 
Because of his large, heavyset frame and imposing looks, Spinell was often cast as criminals, thugs, or corrupt police officers. As a teenager and young adult, Spinell starred in various stage plays, both on and off Broadway.

In 1971, he landed his first film role in a small part as the mafioso hitman Willi Cicci working for the Corleone crime family in the crime film The Godfather, directed by Francis Ford Coppola. It was the highest-grossing film of 1972 and was for a time the highest-grossing film ever made. It won the Oscars for Best Picture, Actor and Best Adapted Screenplay, as well as other nominations. Spinell was so liked by Coppola that he asked Spinell to sit in on much more of the film's shooting than was required, for which he was paid the daily actor rate even if not appearing in the day's scenes.

In 1973, he acted in Aram Avakian's Cops and Robbers, and Philip D'Antoni's The Seven-Ups.

In 1974, Spinell reprised his role as Willi Cicci in The Godfather Part II, where Cicci is still working for the Corleone crime family, but having been promoted from "soldier" (aka: 'button man') to being the personal bodyguard to Frank Pentangeli (Michael V. Gazzo). The film was nominated for eleven Academy Awards, and became the first sequel to win for Best Picture. It was Paramount Pictures' highest-grossing film of 1974 and was the fifth-highest-grossing picture in North America that year. Spinell was set to reprise his role as Willi Cicci in The Godfather Part III (1990) but he died before filming began.

In 1975, he acted in Frank Perry's Rancho Deluxe, Barry Shear's Strike Force, Dick Richards's Farewell, My Lovely, and Thomas McGuane's 92 in the Shade.

In 1976, he acted in Paul Mazursky's Next Stop, Greenwich Village, Martin Scorsese's Taxi Driver, and Bob Rafelson's Stay Hungry. That year, Spinell played a loan shark role in John G. Avildsen's Rocky. It earned $225 million in global box office receipts, becoming the highest-grossing film of 1976, went on to win three Oscars, including Best Picture, and turned lead actor Sylvester Stallone into a major star.

In 1977, he acted in Sorcerer, a thriller adaptation of The Wages of Fear directed by William Friedkin.

In 1978, he acted in Paul Williams's Nunzio, John Milius's Big Wednesday, Sylvester Stallone's Paradise Alley, and The One Man Jury. He also played the main antagonist in Luigi Cozzi's Italian-produced space opera Starcrash, starring Caroline Munro and Marjoe Gortner.

In 1979, he acted in Jonathan Demme's Last Embrace, and William Richert's Winter Kills. Spinell reprised his role as Gazzo in Rocky II this time directed by Sylvester Stallone. Rocky II finished in the top three highest-grossing films of 1979, in both the North American market and worldwide. The film grossed $6,390,537 during its opening weekend, $85,182,160 at the U.S. box office, and $200,182,160 overall.

1980 to 1982: leading man in horror films and subsequent films 
Although primarily known as a character actor, Spinell co-wrote, co-produced, and starred in his first lead role as a serial killer in the 1980 film Maniac, the psychological slasher film directed by William Lustig. 

Also in 1980, he acted in Curtis Hanson's The Little Dragons, William Friedkin's Cruising, William Peter Blatty'sThe Ninth Configuration, Bernard L. Kowalski's Nightside, Stuart Rosenberg's Brubaker, Brian G. Hutton's The First Deadly Sin, and Jonathan Demme's Melvin and Howard''''.

In 1981, Spinell had a supporting role in the Sylvester Stallone action film Nighthawks, and Richard Elfman's Forbidden Zone.

In 1982, he acted in National Lampoon's Movie Madness, Night Shift, Monsignor, and One Down, Two to Go. 

That year he starred in David Winters's horror comedy The Last Horror Film, co-starring Caroline Munro. It played in film festivals, at the Saturn Awards it received nominations, and at the Sitges Film Festival it was part of their official selection, and won best cinematography.

1983 to 1989: Final roles 
In 1983, he played a corrupt lawyer in William Lustig's vigilante film Vigilante. He also acted in Curtis Hanson's Losin' It, Nicolas Roeg's Eureka, and Fred Williamson's The Last Fight .

In 1985, he played the main villain in the crime film Walking the Edge, starring Robert Forster.

In 1986, he acted in John Byrum'sThe Whoopee Boys, Robert Forster's Hollywood Harry, and Fred Williamson's The Messenger. That year, he made Maniac 2: Mr. Robbie, a horror short promotional film directed by Buddy Giovinazzo and co-written by Spinell and Joe Cirillo which was loosely based on a 1973 feature film titled An Eye for an Eye (aka: The Psychopath). The short film was produced by Joe Spinell in order to raise financing for a sequel to Spinell's 1980 horror film Maniac. The short was included with the 30th anniversary edition release of Maniac.

In 1987, Spinell acted in The Pick-up Artist, and Deadly Illusion.

In 1988, Spinell played a corrupt military official in David A. Prior's Operation Warzone. His last lead role was completed in 1988, a slasher film named The Undertaker. The film was never released for the public, only existed in an incomplete form. In 2010, The Undertaker was released on DVD release by Code Red, and restored by Vinegar Syndrome on Blu-ray in 2016. The film is considered a cult classic, due in part to Joe Spinell's involvement and its long and troubled production.

In 1989, Spinell played a U.S. government official in Rapid Fire, directed by David A. Prior which was his final role.

Personal life 
Spinell was married to adult film star Jean Jennings (1957-2011) from February 1977 to July 1979. Together they had one daughter before they divorced.

A close friend of Sylvester Stallone, Spinell was the godfather of his son Sage Stallone. Spinell had a falling out with Sylvester Stallone during the filming of their final collaboration Nighthawks (1981).

Death
Spinell died in his apartment located off Greenpoint Avenue in Sunnyside, Queens, New York on January 13, 1989, at the age of 52. Sometime during that morning, he cut himself badly on his glass shower stall door after apparently slipping in the bathtub while showering. Soon afterward he fell asleep on his living room couch instead of calling for help, and his hemophilia caused him to bleed to death. Spinell was buried in Calvary Cemetery, Queens near his home.

Filmography

Film

Television

References

Works Cited 

 Budnik, Daniel R. (2017). '80s Action Movies on the Cheap. North Carolina: MacFarland & Company Inc.

External links

1936 births
1989 deaths
20th-century American male actors
20th-century American male writers
20th-century American writers
Accidental deaths in New York (state)
American male film actors
American male television actors
American people of Italian descent
Burials at Calvary Cemetery (Queens)
Deaths from bleeding
Male actors from New York City
People from Manhattan
People with haemophilia
People from Woodside, Queens